The 2017 Porsche Carrera Cup Great Britain was a multi-event, one-make motor racing championship held across England and Scotland. The championship featured a mix of professional motor racing teams and privately funded drivers, competing in Porsche 911 GT3 cars that conformed to the technical regulations for the championship. It formed part of the extensive program of support categories built up around the BTCC centrepiece. The 2017 season was the fifteenth Porsche Carrera Cup Great Britain season, commencing on 2 April at Brands Hatch – on the circuit's Indy configuration – and finished on 1 October at the same venue, utilising the Grand Prix circuit, after fifteen races at eight meetings. Fourteen of the races were held in support of the 2017 British Touring Car Championship, with a round in support of the 2017 24 Hours of Le Mans.

Entry list

Race calendar and results
All races will held in the United Kingdom, excepting round at Circuit de la Sarthe in France.

Championship standings

A driver's best 14 scores counted towards the championship, with any other points being discarded.

Drivers' championships

Overall championship

References

External links
 

Porsche Carrera Cup
Porsche Carrera Cup Great Britain seasons